David Hooper may refer to:

 David Vincent Hooper (1915–1998), British chess player and writer
 David Hooper (cricketer) (born 1991), cricketer for Guernsey